Plender is a surname. Notable people with the surname include:

Olivia Plender, British artist 
Sophia Plender MBE, Painting Conservator and Restorer
John Plender, British financial journalist
William Plender, 1st Baron Plender (1861–1946), British chartered accountant and public servant

Olivia Plender works in Tate Gallery Collection 
Olivia Plender's website 
Dulwich Picture Gallery website Dulwich Picture Gallery Website